Ziaeddin Niknafs,(born 19 September 1986 in Sanandaj) is an Iranian football defender who currently plays for Sanat Naft in Iran Pro League. He is a young left footed defender who can play as both a left back and central defender.

Club career

He was part of the squad that won the league for Persepolis in 2007–08 season but did not play any match. He finally played a match for Persepolis in his second season in Hazfi Cup.

Club career statistics

 Assist Goals

Honours

Iran's Premier Football League Winner: 1
2007/08 with Persepolis

External links
Profile at Persianleague.com

Iranian footballers
Association football defenders
Persepolis F.C. players
Sanat Naft Abadan F.C. players
Living people
1986 births
Kurdish sportspeople
People from Sanandaj